Peter Boulton is an Australian former rugby league footballer who played in the 1960s and 1970s.

Playing career
Boulton came from Grafton, New South Wales. He joined Balmain in 1969, and in his second first grade game, he was selected at hooker for the Tigers team that won the 1969 Grand Final. 

Boulton played seven seasons with the Tigers between 1969-1975, before retiring from first grade rugby league after suffering a succession of knee injuries.

References

Living people
Australian rugby league players
Balmain Tigers players
Year of birth missing (living people)
Rugby league players from Grafton, New South Wales